The Towaco Formation is a mapped bedrock unit in New Jersey.  It is named for the unincorporated village of Towaco, which is near the place its type section was described by paleontologist Paul E. Olsen.

Description 
The Towaco Formation is composed of reddish brown, reddish purple, gray, grayish-green, and white sandstone of varying grain thickness, as well as black siltstone and calcareous mudstone. Clastic/conglomerate beds are known to exist, including a 1-meter (~3 feet) thick volcaniclastic bed in the upper portion of the formation.

Depositional environment 
The Towaco Formation can be characterized as a continuation of the Passaic Formation, which is mostly playa and alluvial fan deposits resulting from the rifting of Pangea. The primarily red color of this formation is often evidence that the sediments were deposited in arid conditions.  However, the Towaco Formation differs from the Passaic Formation in that it contains a more significant portion of non-red layers, which were laid down by deep lakes present during wetter periods.

One of the key differences between the Towaco Formation and earlier Triassic/Jurassic sedimentary formations of the Newark Basin is that it contains much longer cyclical deposition periods.  Cycles in the Towaco Formation are represented by sequences of rock ten times thicker than sequences seen in the Lockatong and Passaic formations.

Additionally, compared to the underlying Feltville Formation, the Towaco Formation contains a much more significant clastic component.

Fossil content 
Fish fossils, commonly those of the ray-finned Semionotus, can be found within the formation.  In other layers, indeterminate fossil ornithischian tracks have been noted, along with additional reptile and dinosaur prints.  Carbonized plant remains and impressions, as well as root structures and pollen, are present.  Coprolite can also be found within the formation.

Age 
The Towaco Formation rests conformably above the Preakness Mountain Basalt and below the Hook Mountain Basalt, placing its deposition somewhere between approximately 198 and 197 million years ago during the early Jurassic stage known as the Hettangian.

See also 
 Geology of New Jersey
 List of dinosaur-bearing rock formations
 List of stratigraphic units with ornithischian tracks
 Indeterminate ornithischian tracks

References 
In-line citations

Additional references
 Weishampel, David B.; Dodson, Peter; and Osmólska, Halszka (eds.): The Dinosauria, 2nd, Berkeley: University of California Press. 861 pp. 

Hettangian Stage
Sandstone formations of the United States
Siltstone formations
Mudstone formations
Ichnofossiliferous formations
Geologic formations of New Jersey
Paleontology in New Jersey